

Charles Carroll Soule (June 25, 1842 – January 7, 1913) was an American bookman with a side specialty in the architecture of libraries. Born in Boston to Richard Soule, Jr. (1812–1877) and Harriet Winsor (1816–1905) he attended the Boston Latin School and Harvard College (1862), and fought in the Civil War (44th and 55th Regiment Massachusetts Volunteer Infantries). After the war he engaged in public speaking about post-slavery reconciliation in Orangeburg County, South Carolina.

In the 1870s he worked in St. Louis in the publishing firm of Soule, Thomas & Winsor.
 In the 1880s he ran a business selling law books from offices in Pemberton Square, Boston, and in 1886 opened a bookshop in a former church on Beacon Street, near the Boston Athenaeum. He established the Boston Book Company in 1889, and established The Green Bag, a legal news magazine with Horace Williams Fuller as editor. He belonged to the American Library Association.

He married Louisa Charless Farwell in 1878 and had 4 children. Towards the end of his life he resided in Brookline.

See also
 Saint Paul Public Library, Minnesota, designed by Soule

References

Further reading
By Soule
  1881-1890. (with James A. Bugbee)
 
 
 
  circa 1900s. v.3 (1902)
 
 

About Soule

External links

  (photo portrait, shows Soule in center)
 
 Portrait of Soule?, circa 1860s
 WorldCat. Soule, Charles C. (Charles Carroll) 1842-1913

American publishers (people)
Businesspeople from Boston
1842 births
1913 deaths
Economic history of Boston
People of Massachusetts in the American Civil War
American booksellers
Harvard University alumni
Boston Latin School alumni
19th-century American businesspeople